The 2004 Rally Mexico (formally the 1st Corona Rally Mexico) was the third round of the 2004 World Rally Championship. The race was held over three days between 12 March and 14 March 2004, and was based in León, Mexico. Ford's Markko Märtin won the race, his 3rd win in the World Rally Championship.

Background

Entry list

Itinerary
All dates and times are CST (UTC−6).

Results

Overall

World Rally Cars

Classification

Special stages

Championship standings

Production World Rally Championship

Classification

Special stages

Championship standings

References

External links 
 Official website of the World Rally Championship

Mexico
Rally Mexico
Rally